The 2008 Sokoto State gubernatorial by-election occurred on May 24, 2008. PDP candidate Aliyu Magatakarda Wamakko won the election, defeating DPP Muhammed Dingyadi and other candidates.

Results
Aliyu Magatakarda Wamakko from the PDP won the election. He defeated Muhammed Dingyadi of the DPP and several others.

The total number of votes cast was 785,682, valid votes was 698,362 and rejected votes was 87,320.

Aliyu Magatakarda Wamakko, (PDP)- 562,395
Muhammed Dingyadi, DPP- 124,046
CPP- 6,286
ANPP- 1,842
PPA- 1,658

References 

Gubernatorial by-election 2008
Sokoto State gubernatorial by-election
Sokoto State gubernatorial by-election